Way of the Dead is the second studio album by Yakuza, released in 2002. It marks a distinct departure from the post-hardcore of their debut, and instead displays a more experimental style, with elements of alternative metal, sludge metal, hardcore and even jazz. Some refer to their eclectic sound as "jazzcore." The second half of the album is composed entirely of the 43-minute track "01000011110011", an extended electric avant-jazz jam.

Track listing

Personnel
Bruce Lamont - vocals, saxophones, clarinet, effects
Matt McClelland - guitars, vocals
Jackson - bass
James Staffel - drums, percussion, keyboards

References

2002 albums
Yakuza (band) albums
Century Media Records albums